Catoptromancy (Gk. κάτοπτρον, katoptron, "mirror," and μαντεία, manteia, "divination"), also known as captromancy or enoptromancy, is divination using a mirror.

Pausanias, an ancient Greek traveler, described as follows: 

In Ancient Rome, the priests who used catoptromancy were called specularii.

In popular culture 

 War and Peace by Leo Tolstoy
 Snow White by The Brothers Grimm

See also
 Crystal gazing
 Psychomanteum
 Scrying

References

Further reading
Armand Delatte, La catoptromancie grecque et ses dérivés (1932)

External links
 Captromancy (or Enoptromancy)
 https://web.archive.org/web/20060529005509/http://agnosticwitch.catcara.com/divindex-part1.htm

Divination
Mirrors